Marilyn Mims (born September 8, 1954) is an American operatic soprano who had an active career during the 1980s and 1990s. A regular performer at the Metropolitan Opera from 1988 to 1992, her singing career was cut short after being diagnosed with endometriosis in 1995. She notably sang the role of Ortlinde on the Met's 1987 recording of Die Walküre under James Levine for Deutsche Grammophon, which won the Grammy Award for Best Opera Recording. She currently teaches on the voice faculty at Palm Beach Atlantic University.

Life and career
Born and raised in Collins, Mississippi, Mims earned a bachelor's degree in music from the University of Southern Mississippi and studied vocal performance at the Jacobs School of Music at Indiana University. At IU she was a pupil of renowned soprano Virginia Zeani.  Marilyn Mims also studied voice with Dr. Jay W. Wilkey.

In 1986 Mims won the Metropolitan Opera National Council Auditions. She made her professional opera debut the following year at the New York City Opera as Violetta in Verdi's La traviata. In 1988 she sang the role of Isabelle in Meyerbeer's Robert le Diable with the Opera Orchestra of New York at Carnegie Hall. That same year she made her debut at the Met as Rosalinde in Die Fledermaus opposite Thomas Allen as Eisenstein and Judith Blegen as Adele. She continued to sing roles at the Met annually through 1992, portraying Constanze in Die Entführung aus dem Serail, Donna Anna in Don Giovanni, Fiordiligi in Così fan tutte, Gilda in Rigoletto, Violetta in La traviata, and the title role in Lucia di Lammermoor.

In 1990 Mims made her debut at the San Francisco Opera as Nedda in Pagliacci. She returned to San Francisco in 1991 to portray Donna Anna in Don Giovanni. Other American companies she sang leading roles with included the Michigan Opera Theatre and the Santa Fe Opera.

References

Living people
American operatic sopranos
Jacobs School of Music alumni
Singers from Mississippi
Palm Beach Atlantic University faculty
People from Collins, Mississippi
University of Mississippi alumni
Winners of the Metropolitan Opera National Council Auditions
20th-century American women opera singers
1954 births
American women academics
21st-century American women
People with Endometriosis